Future University may refer to:

 Future University Hakodate
 Future University in Egypt
 The Future University (Sudan)